The Whigham GW-2 is an American high-wing, single-seat, V-tailed, FAI Open Class glider that was designed and constructed by Gene Whigham, a retired flight test engineer for Convair.

Design and development
The GW-2 was intended as a model that improved upon the performance of the GW-1. To that end it uses a  span wing with a much higher aspect ratio of 26:1 and a Wortmann FX 61-184 airfoil. The GW-2 also uses a V-tail.

The GW-2 is an all-metal design, with doped aircraft fabric covering on the aft part of the wing, behind the spar. The wing mounts spoilers for glide-path control. The landing gear is a fixed monowheel, with a secondary skid.

The prototype GW-2 was registered as N94291 and first flown in 1964. A second GW-2 was also completed.

Operational history
The prototype GW-1 was flown in three US National competitions.

In July 2011 one GW-2 remained on the Federal Aviation Administration registry.

Specifications (GW-2)

See also

References

1960s United States sailplanes
Homebuilt aircraft
Aircraft first flown in 1964
V-tail aircraft
High-wing aircraft